Xavier Malisse and Olivier Rochus were the defending champions, but lost in the third round against third seeds and eventual finalists Bob & Mike Bryan.

Jonas Björkman and Max Mirnyi defeated The Bryans in the final to win the title, it was their first title as a team. With the victory, Björkman completed the Career Grand Slam, having won the three other Major tournaments previously.

Seeds
The seeded teams are listed below. Jonas Björkman and Max Mirnyi are the champions; others show the round in which they were eliminated.

Draw

Finals

Top half

Section 1

Section 2

Bottom half

Section 3

Section 4

See also
 2005 Men's Singles
 2005 Women's Singles
 2005 Women's Doubles
 2005 Mixed Doubles

External links
ATP Draw
2005 French Open – Men's draws and results at the International Tennis Federation

Mens doubles
French Open by year – Men's doubles
French Open